Grandstand was a British television sport programme. Broadcast between 1958 and 2007, it was one of the BBC's longest running sports shows, alongside BBC Sports Personality of the Year.

The last editions of Grandstand were broadcast over the weekend of 27–28 January 2007.

History
During the 1950s, sports coverage on television in the United Kingdom gradually expanded. The BBC regularly broadcast sports programmes with an outside studio team, occasionally from two or three separate locations. Production assistant Bryan Cowgill put forward a proposal for a programme lasting three hours; one hour dedicated to major events and two hours showing minor events. Outside Broadcast members held a meeting in April 1958, and Cowgill further detailed his plans taking timing and newer technical facilities into consideration. During the development of the programme, problems arose over the proposed schedule which would result in the programme ending at 4:45pm to allow children's programmes to go out. Paul Fox insisted that the service was broadcast until 5:00pm to ensure a proper results service.

Three weeks before the debut of the programme, sports broadcaster Peter Dimmock favoured naming the show Out and About! with Fox persuading Dimmock to agree on a new name, which was Grandstand. Grandstand launched on 11 October 1958 from Lime Grove Studios with Dimmock as the presenter. Dimmock presented the first two editions and three weeks later, he was replaced by sports commentator David Coleman. In the autumn of 1959, Grandstand was extended by an extra 15 minutes and would finish at 5:00pm every Saturday. According to Richard Haynes in BBC Sport in Black and White, the 1960s saw the Grandstand name "become synonymous with the BBC's coverage of sport" and it "became a trusted vehicle for British viewers to access a variety of sports."

The show was one of the most recognisable on British television, dominating Saturday afternoons on the BBC's main channel and covering nearly every major sporting event in Britain such as the FA Cup Final, Wimbledon, the Grand National and the University Boat Race, as well as major international events like the Olympic Games, the Paralympic Games, the Commonwealth Games and the FIFA World Cup (from 1998 FIFA World Cup coverage would switch from Grandstand to Match of the Day branding). 

A Sunday edition, named Sunday Grandstand, launched in 1981 and was broadcast on BBC2 (though a few pilot editions were shown on BBC1 in 1978, 1979 and 1980). Until 1998, the Sunday edition was usually only broadcast during the summer months, although there were exceptions, such as a special edition in January 1995 to cover the second Regal Trophy semi-final (Wigan v Castleford).

From February 1998 Sunday Grandstand became a year-round programme, incorporating the Ski Sunday and Rugby Special programmes. Grandstand was not shown on 20 May 2000 as no major sporting events broadcast by the BBC were taking place.

From the programme's launch until the lifting of restrictions on broadcasting hours by the Minister of Posts and Telecommunications in 1972, sports coverage was one of the few programming areas which was exempt from the broadcasting hours restrictions. Instead, sporting coverage and outside broadcasts were provided with a separate quota of broadcasting hours per year by the Postmaster General. By the mid 1960s this amounted to 350 hours per year. This meant Grandstand was a key part of the BBC's Saturday afternoon schedules, as the time the programme was on the air did not count towards the 50-hour a week restriction on normal broadcasting hours.

Beginning in the early 1980s, a lunchtime news summary provided by BBC News was included in the broadcast, functioning as a programme break between Football Focus and the start of that week's live events.

In October 2001, the head of BBC Sports and Programming Pat Younge announced plans to revamp Grandstand by placing emphasis on broadcasting one particular sport rather than alternating between several sports.

Final Score
In the late afternoon, with many Football League and Scottish Football League matches approaching full-time, the programme would draw to a close with Final Score. This covered not only the results from all the matches, but also gave the results of the football pools. Perhaps the segment's most famous feature is the vidiprinter, a digital device which printed out the results as they came through, with the characters in each result appearing one by one. Only two people regularly read out the classified results on Final Score when it was part of Grandstand: the Australian Len Martin (from the first programme until his death in 1995) and Tim Gudgin (from 1995 until Final Score was separated from Grandstand in 2001 – he continued to read the classified results until 2011). Whilst football was the primary focus of Final Score, news and results from other sports, such as rugby union, and until 1987, racing results, were also included.

A shorter version was aired during the summer during the football close season, and stand-alone editions of Final Score were broadcast on Boxing Day, New Year's Day and Easter Monday when there was a full programme of football fixtures and when Grandstand was not being shown.

Competition from ITV
Between 1965 and 1985, Grandstand faced competition from ITV's World of Sport, but by the end of the 1980s ITV had stopped broadcasting Saturday afternoon sport in favour of other programmes.

Football Focus and Final Score part company
In August 2001, the Football Focus section, having been the first feature on Grandstand since 1974, became a separate programme in its own right. This meant that Grandstand'''s start time was now 13:00 rather than 12:15.

At the same time, Final Score also become a programme in its own right, running from 16:30, meaning that Grandstand only broadcast between 13:00 and 16:30. "Around the Grounds" and the half time sequence did remain within the Grandstand programme. In 2004, following the success of Sky Sports' Soccer Saturday programme featuring reports from the afternoon's football matches, the BBC introduced its own football scores programme called Score. It ran for the full duration of the afternoon's football matches, beginning at 14:30, and was available as an add-on service on the Red Button until 16:30 when BBC One joined the programme and at that point Score would become Final Score.

Later years and demise
In its final few years, the show was rarely presented from a studio and as such there was no longer a main presenter. The show tended to be broadcast from wherever the main event of the day was taking place. The host would be associated with that feature; for example, Hazel Irvine would host snooker, Sue Barker for tennis, Clare Balding for racing or rugby league, and John Inverdale for rugby union.

2006 announcement
On 24 April 2006, the BBC announced that Grandstand would be gradually phased out after nearly fifty years, due to the increasing use of interactive services and the need to meet the challenges of the digital, on-demand world. This had been hinted at by the dropping of the "Grandstand" title from the BBC's coverage of the major international sporting events, like that year's Winter Olympics and Commonwealth Games.

It was originally intended that the show would end in 2009, but this was brought forward to 28 January 2007.

After Grandstand ended
The last Saturday edition of Grandstand was broadcast on 27 January 2007, and the final edition was broadcast the following day, 28 January 2007, with a short tribute to the history of the show forming its final feature. Sport still features prominently on the BBC's schedules on Saturday afternoon as well as on BBC Red Button and iPlayer; Final Score is still shown at the end of the football matches played on Saturday afternoon.

Presenters

Hosts included were Peter Dimmock, David Coleman, Frank Bough, Des Lynam, Steve Rider, Ronald Allison, Clare Balding, Sue Barker, Barry Davies, Dougie Donnelly, Harry Carpenter, Harry Gration, Tony Gubba, David Icke, John Inverdale, Hazel Irvine, Gary Lineker, Roger Black, Helen Rollason, Ray Stubbs, David Vine, Alan Weeks and Bob Wilson.

Theme tune
The original theme was "News Scoop" by Len Stevens, which was used until 6 November 1971. From 13 November 1971 to 11 October 1975, another tune, composed by Barry Stoller, who also composed the Match of the Day theme, was used. The programme's longest running and best known theme, composed for the programme by Keith Mansfield, was first heard at the end of the 11 October 1975 edition (the 1000th edition of Grandstand) and remained until the end of the programme's existence.

Notable live events
 Foinavon winning the 1967 Grand National at odds of 100/1 following a 23rd fence pile up in which every other horse fell or was remounted – the fence was subsequently named in Foinavon's honour.
 Golfer Tony Jacklin hitting the first live televised hole in one in Britain during the Dunlop Masters on 16 September 1967.
 Gareth Edwards scoring one of the most memorable tries in history, in the Barbarians v All Blacks rugby union match at Cardiff Arms Park on 27 January 1973.
 The first known streaker at a major sporting event during an England v France Rugby Union match at Twickenham on 20 April 1974.
 Cambridge sinking in the 1978 University Boat Race and again in 1984, after colliding with a stationary barge.
 A fight breaking out on air between staff in the newsroom behind presenter Des Lynam on 1 April 1989. This was later revealed to be an April Fool's Day joke.
 The Hillsborough football ground disaster on 15 April 1989.
 The Grand National on 3 April 1993 being declared void after two false starts – 30 horses ran the race when their jockeys mistakenly assumed the course officials waving red flags were protesters.
 Roland Ratzenberger and Ayrton Senna's fatal accidents during the San Marino Grand Prix on 30 April and 1 May 1994 (Sunday Grandstand).
 Jockey Frankie Dettori winning all seven races at Ascot on 28 September 1996.
 The evacuation of Aintree Racecourse on 5 April 1997 due to an IRA bomb threat that caused the cancellation of the Grand National (the race took place two days later).

See also
 Wide World of Sports Broadcasting of sports events
 Colemanballs
 World of Sport''

References

External links
 

1958 British television series debuts
2007 British television series endings
1950s British sports television series
1960s British sports television series
1970s British sports television series
1980s British sports television series
1990s British sports television series
2000s British sports television series
BBC Sport
BBC Television shows
Black-and-white British television shows
Olympics on television
English-language television shows